Marcos Luciano Camiña (born 18 March 1995) is an Argentinian football player from Ingeniero Jacobacci, Argentina. Camiña began his career at Nahuel Niyeo's youth team in Ingeniero Jacobacci and has since played consecutively for the football clubs Peña Azul y Oro Viedma, Atlético de Rafaela, U.C. Sampdoria in Italy and Fútbol Alcobendas Sport. He currently plays for Torres Calcio, a team in Italy's Serie D League.

References

Argentine footballers
1995 births
Living people
Association footballers not categorized by position